Tracholena is a genus of moths belonging to the subfamily Tortricinae of the family Tortricidae.

Species
Tracholena dialeuca Common, 1982
Tracholena hedraea Common, 1982
Tracholena homopolia (Turner, 1945)
Tracholena indicata Diakonoff, 1973
Tracholena lipara Common, 1973
Tracholena liparodes Dugdale, 2005
Tracholena micropolia (Turner, 1916)
Tracholena nigrilinea Dugdale, 2005
Tracholena paniense Dugdale, 2005
Tracholena sulfurosa (Meyrick, 1910)

See also
List of Tortricidae genera

References

External links
tortricidae.com

Schoenotenini